Kirchspielslandgemeinde Weddingstedt was an Amt ("collective municipality") in the district of Dithmarschen, in Schleswig-Holstein, Germany. Its seat was in Weddingstedt. In January 2008, it was merged with the Amt Kirchspielslandgemeinde Heide-Land and the municipality Norderwöhrden to form the Amt Kirchspielslandgemeinde Heider Umland.

The Amt Kirchspielslandgemeinde Weddingstedt consisted of the following municipalities (with population in 2005):

 Neuenkirchen (1.044)
 Ostrohe (963)
 Stelle-Wittenwurth (486)
 Weddingstedt (2.321)
 Wesseln (1.352)

Former Ämter in Schleswig-Holstein